Mamy may refer to:

 Jean Mamy, French actor, producer, film and theatre director, screenwriter and journalist,
 Mamy (Moms (film)), Russian film